Cleeve Prior is a village in the Vale of Evesham Worcestershire, England. It is situated five miles north-east of Evesham. There are many picturesque houses made from the local lias stone, including the Kings Arms public house and the 150-year-old school. The church is dedicated to St. Andrew, and has 6 bells which are rung for the parish service each Sunday.

History

The name Cleeve, attested in the Domesday Book of 1086 as Clyve, comes from the dative singular form of the Old English word clif ('cliff, bank, steep hill'), referring in this case to the rising ground above the River Avon on which the village is situated. The estate was the property of the Priors of Worcester from early times (recorded in their Latin records as Clyve Prioris) accounting for the Prior element of the name, distinguishing it from nearby Bishop's Cleeve.

References

External links
 http://www.cleeveprior.org.uk/

Villages in Worcestershire